Neoxyonyx is a genus of beetles belonging to the family Curculionidae.

Species:
 Neoxyonyx monticola Desbr., 1895 
 Neoxyonyx strigatirostris Colonnelli, 1995

References

Curculionidae
Curculionidae genera